Yan Ni is the name of:

Yan Ni (actress) (born 1971), Chinese actress
Yan Ni (volleyball) (born 1987), Chinese volleyball player
Shan Sa (born 1972), born Yan Ni, Chinese-born French writer

See also
Yanni (disambiguation)